The South African Railways Class ME 2-6-6-2 of 1912 was a steam locomotive.

In January 1912, the South African Railways placed a single Class ME Mallet articulated steam locomotive with a 2-6-6-2 wheel arrangement in service.

Manufacturer
During 1911, the Central South African Railways (CSAR) placed an order for a single experimental simple expansion Mallet articulated steam locomotive with the North British Locomotive Company (NBL). The locomotive was intended for test purposes on branch lines with light  rail.

By the time it was delivered in January 1912, the CSAR had already become part of the newly established South African Railways (SAR). The locomotive was therefore classified as the sole Class ME and numbered 1618 on the SAR roster.

Characteristics
Its Belpaire firebox extended over the second and third coupled wheels of the rear engine unit.

Compared to other Mallet locomotives which were placed in service during the first decade of the SAR’s existence, the Class ME was unique in being arranged as a simple expansion (simplex) locomotive with four high-pressure cylinders instead of the more usual compound expansion arrangement of two high-pressure and two low-pressure cylinders.

The cylinders were arranged outside the plate frames and the  diameter trick-ported piston valves, designed for inside admission, were actuated by Walschaerts valve gear. Each engine unit was equipped with an independent Wakefield mechanical lubricator to supply oil to the valves and pistons.

The boiler was equipped with a Schmidt superheater. Steam distribution to the four cylinders was rather unique, being led from the superheater header in the smokebox to a steam collector box which was arranged between the two cylinders of the rear engine unit, from where a branch was led to the cylinders of the front engine unit by a central steam pipe with flexible joints, since this engine unit could move sideways in relation to the boiler barrel. This pipe took the place of the usual receiver pipe on compound Mallets.

The blast pipe had separate outlets for the exhaust steam from each engine unit, with the rear engine unit's exhaust feeding through an annulus arranged around the exhaust from the front engine unit. A device was installed by which either engine unit could be cut out whilst running so that steam could be admitted to one pair of cylinders only when running light engine.

Service
The Class ME proved to be successful in operation and, even though it was acquired as an experimental locomotive, remained in service for 25 years. It spent its last years working on the line from Nelspruit to Sabie in the Eastern Transvaal Lowveld, until it was withdrawn and scrapped in 1937.

Illustration

References

2250
2250
2-6-6-2 locomotives
(1C)C1 locomotives
NBL locomotives
Cape gauge railway locomotives
Railway locomotives introduced in 1912
1912 in South Africa
Scrapped locomotives